John P. Meyer Sr. (August 17, 1920 – October 31, 2013) was an American judge and politician.

Meyer was born in Danville, Illinois. He graduated from Danville High School in 1937. He received his bachelor's degree from the University of Notre Dame and his law degree from the Notre Dame Law School. He was admitted to the Illinois bar and practiced law in Danville. Meyer served in the United States Army during World War II. Meyer served in the Illinois House of Representatives from 1948 to 1952. He was a Republican. Meyer then served in the Illinois Senate from 1952 to 1962. Meyer served as an Illinois Circuit Court judge. He wrote a book: Observations of an Elderly Gentleman. Meyer raised and raced thoroughbred horses with his wife. He died in Danville, Illinois.

Notes

External links

1920 births
2013 deaths
People from Danville, Illinois
Military personnel from Illinois
Writers from Illinois
University of Notre Dame alumni
Notre Dame Law School alumni
Illinois lawyers
Illinois state court judges
Republican Party Illinois state senators
Republican Party members of the Illinois House of Representatives
20th-century American judges
20th-century American lawyers
United States Army personnel of World War II